The 2010–11 Combined Counties Football League season was the 33rd in the history of the Combined Counties Football League, a football competition in England.

Premier Division

The Premier Division featured one new team in a league of 21 teams after the promotion of North Greenford United to the Southern Football League:
 Mole Valley SCR, promoted as champions of Division One.

League table

Division One

Division One featured two new teams in a league of 19 teams: 
Farnborough North End, transferred from the Wessex League
Hayes Gate, joining from the Middlesex County League

League table

References

 League tables

External links
 Combined Counties League Official Site

2010-11
9